Tacoma Narrows Airport  is a county-owned, public-use airport located  west of the central business district of Tacoma, a city in Pierce County, Washington, United States. It is situated south of Gig Harbor, Washington, one mile southwest of the Tacoma Narrows Bridge. The airport was owned by the city of Tacoma until 2008, when it was purchased by Pierce County.

It is included in the Federal Aviation Administration (FAA) National Plan of Integrated Airport Systems for 2019–2023, in which it is categorized as a local general aviation facility.

Facilities and aircraft 

Tacoma Narrows Airport covers an area of 644 acres (261 ha) at an elevation of 295 feet (90 m) above mean sea level. It has one runway designated 17/35 with an asphalt surface measuring 5,002 by 100 feet (1,525 x 46 m).

For the 12-month period ending December 31, 2016, the airport had 53,276 aircraft operations, an average of 146 per day: 97% general aviation, 2% air taxi, and 1% military. In August 2019, there were 64 aircraft based at this airport: 60 single-engine and 4 multi-engine.

Cargo airlines

Commercial airlines 

Tacoma Narrows Airport is not served by any scheduled commercial carriers. Currently PerryCook Flight Services provides non-scheduled commercial air taxi charter service from TIW.

During the 1960s it was served by West Coast Airlines. During the late 1960s and early 1970s, it was served by Hughes Airwest. An excerpt from the July 1, 1972, timetable shows nonstop routes to Seattle and Olympia—the latter continuing on to Hoquiam/Aberdeen, Astoria, and Portland.

General aviation
FBOs:
 Narrows Aviation Air Center
 Pavco Flight Center
Aircraft charter:	
 Clay Lacy Aviation  
 PerryCook Flight Services

References

External links 
 Tacoma Narrows Airport at Pierce County website
 Tacoma Narrows Airport at Washington State DOT website
 Aerial image as of June 1990 from USGS The National Map
 
 

Airports in Washington (state)
Transportation buildings and structures in Pierce County, Washington
Gig Harbor, Washington